David Short may refer to:

 David Short (cricketer) (born 1934), former English cricketer
 David Short (cyclist), Australian Paralympic tandem cycling pilot